

Academic facilities

Advanced Technology Research Center
Agricultural Center Offices
Agricultural Hall
Animal Disease Diagnostic Laboratory
Animal Sciences
Architecture Building
Bartlett Center for the Visual Arts
BioSystems and Agricultural Engineering Laboratory
Boren Veterinary Medicine Teaching Hospital
Business Building
Civil Engineering Laboratory
Classroom Building
Controlled Environmental Research Laboratory
Cordell Hall
Edmon Low Library
Electronics Laboratory
Engineering North
Engineering South
Fire Protection and Safety Technology Laboratory
Food and Agricultural Products Research and Technology Center
Greenhouses
Gundersen Hall
Hanner Hall
Hazardous Reaction Laboratory
Human Environmental Sciences
Human Environmental Sciences West
Library Annex
Life Sciences East
Life Sciences West
MAE Research Laboratory
Math Sciences
McElroy Hall
Morrill Hall
Noble Research Center
North Classroom Building (finished late 2008)
Paul Miller Journalism and Broadcasting Building
Physical Sciences
Scott Hall
Seretean Center For the Performing Arts
Social Sciences and Humanities (formerly known as Murray Hall)
Thatcher Hall
Visual Arts Annex
Willard Hall

Athletic facilities

Allie P. Reynolds Stadium
Boone Pickens Stadium
Cowboy Tennis Complex
Cowgirl Soccer Stadium
Cowgirl Softball Complex
Equestrian Center
Gallagher-Iba Arena
Indoor Hitting Facility
K. B. Droke Track Center
National Wrestling Hall of Fame and Museum
Michael and Anne Greenwood Tennis Center
Sherman E. Smith Training Center

Residential facilities

Traditional halls
Iba Hall
Kerr-Drummond Hall (closed)
Scott Hall (closed)
Parker Hall
Stout Hall
Wentz Hall
Willham Hall (tore down)

Suite-style halls

Bennett Hall
Booker-Stichcomb Hall
Patchin-Jones Hall
Village A-F Suites
Zink-Allen Hall

Apartments
Bost Hall
Brumley Apartments
Davis Hall
Demaree Apartments
Kamm Hall
McPherson Hall
Morsani-Smith Hall
Morrison Apartments
Peterson-Friend Hall
Prosser Apartments
Sitlington Hall
Stevens Apartments
West Apartments
Williams Apartments
Young Hall

Student life and Administrative services

Willham House (President's Residence)
4-H Youth Development
Bennett Memorial Chapel
Central Dining Services
Colvin Center Annex
Colvin Recreation Center
Conoco Philips Alumni Center
Family Resource Center
Fire Station
Griffith Community Center
Intramural Fields
Kerr Drummond Mezzanine
Laundry Married Student Housing
Patillo's Community Center
Physical Plant Services
Power Plant
Public Information Office (PIO)
Scott Pasker Wentz Café
Seretean Wellness Center
Student Union
Telecommunications Center
The Market
Transportation Services
University Health Services
USDA Building
Vocational Technology Print Shop
Wes Watkins Center
 Whitehurst Hall administration building

Facilities under construction or renovation

Intermodal Transportation Facility (starting Spring 2007)
McKnight Center for the Performing Arts (finishing in October 2019)
Old Central (renovation starting Summer 2007)
South Murray Hall (renovation starting Summer 2007)
Oklahoma Animal Disease Diagnostic Laboratory 
University Printing Services

Notable buildings demolished

Williams Hall, demolished 1969, nicknamed the Castle of the Prairies
Home Economics/Geography building, demolished 2005
Library Building
Willham Hall complex, demolished 2005
Ceramics
Dairy Building
Cordell Hall, demolished 2018

See also
 Oklahoma State University–Stillwater

References

Official OSU Physical Plant Building Database

Oklahoma State University
Oklahoma State University
Buildings and structures in Stillwater, Oklahoma
Oklahoma State University